Mohamed ben Abdallah ben Taieb ben Al Habib (c. 1925 – 27 June 1956), commonly known by his nom de guerre Abbas Messaadi, was the leader of the Moroccan Army of Liberation before his controversial assassination in June 1956 that would ultimately trigger the Rif Revolt (1957-1959). He became known as "Messadi" because he was born in Douar Oulad Ali Boumsaad.

Abbas was running a military camp in Aknoul and was assassinated in Fes in June 1956 allegedly by Karim Hajjaj, a member of the Istiqlal party. His assassination was allegedly ordered by Mehdi Ben Barka. Karim Hajjaj was arrested and convicted of his murder but was later pardoned by the king Mohammed V. It is claimed that his true assassins were thugs from Taza, who were hired for his execution.

He was first buried in Fes but in 1957 his remains were transferred to Ajdir, the stronghold of Mohamed ben Abdelkrim al-Khattabi, against the wishes of the Moroccan Ministry of the Interior then controlled by the Istiqlal party. When security forces were sent by the ministry to repatriate the body to Fes, this sparked clashes with the population in Ajdir which led to the Rif revolt.

His killing was the first in a series of assassinations directed against members of the Moroccan Army of liberation and other factions competing with the Istiqlal party and the Alaouite family.

See also
Mahjoubi Aherdane
Abdelkrim al-Khatib

References

1956 deaths
People from Guercif
Moroccan generals
Moroccan military leaders
Moroccan independence activists
Assassinated Moroccan people
Members of the Moroccan Army of Liberation
Deaths by firearm in Morocco
1920s births